Albert Jean de Grandpré  (14 September 1921 – 31 July 2022) was a Canadian lawyer and businessman who served as the president and chief executive officer of Bell Canada Enterprises Inc.

Life and career 
Born in Montreal, Quebec, he was educated at Collège Jean-de-Brébeuf and received a BCL from McGill University in 1943. He joined Bell Canada as a general counsel in 1966 and was made president in 1973. He became chairman and CEO in 1976 and was the first chairman and CEO when the BCE holding company was created in 1983. He retired from the company in 1989.

From 1984 until 1991, he was the fifteenth Chancellor of McGill University. Since 1996, he has been chairman of the board of Theratechnologies, a Canadian biopharmaceutical company.

Grandpré turned 100 in September 2021, and died on 31 July 2022.

Honours and awards 
In 1981, he was made an Officer of the Order of Canada.  He was promoted to Companion in 1987.

Grandpré has received honorary doctorates from the University of Quebec (1979), McGill University (1981), Université de Montréal (1989), the University of Ottawa (1982), and Bishop's University (1983).

References 

1921 births
2022 deaths
French Quebecers
Businesspeople from Montreal
Canadian centenarians
Chancellors of McGill University
Companions of the Order of Canada
Lawyers from Montreal
McGill University Faculty of Law alumni
Men centenarians